Anders Kvissberg (24 January 1929 – 24 April 2018) was a Swedish sport shooter who competed in the 1956 Summer Olympics and in the 1960 Summer Olympics.

References

1929 births
2018 deaths
Swedish male sport shooters
ISSF rifle shooters
Olympic shooters of Sweden
Shooters at the 1956 Summer Olympics
Shooters at the 1960 Summer Olympics